The 1976 Chatham Cup was the 49th annual nationwide knockout football competition in New Zealand.

Early stages of the competition were run in three regions (northern, central, and southern), with the National League teams receiving a bye until the later stages of the competition. In all, 146 teams took part in the competition - a record for the time. Note: Different sources give different numberings for the rounds of the competition: some start round one with the beginning of the regional qualifications; others start numbering from the first national knock-out stage. The former numbering scheme is used in this article.

The 1976 final
Christchurch United, coached by Terry Conley, became only the second team (after Waterside in 1938-40) to win the cup on three successive occasions. Seven players played on all three winning sides, among them future New Zealand captain Steve Sumner. Three of these players (Graham Griffiths, Brian Hardman, and Ian Park) had also played in Christchurch United's winning side in the 1972 final.

The final against Eastern Suburbs was a one-sided affair (United had had a harder task in their semi-final against Blockhouse Bay). The South Island side scored four, though the first of these was an own goal by Suburbs' Tom Bell. Norman Moran picked up a brace before the scoring was completed by Mark McNaughton.

Results

Third round

* Won on penalties by Whangarei (5-2) and Petone (3-0)

Fourth round

* Won on penalties by Mt. Wellington (4-2)

Fifth round

* Won on penalties by Blockhouse Bay (4-3), New Brighton (4-3), and North Shore United (4-3)

Sixth Round

Semi-finals

Semi-final replay

Final

References

Rec.Sport.Soccer Statistics Foundation New Zealand 1976 page
UltimateNZSoccer website 1976 Chatham Cup page

Chatham Cup
Chatham Cup
Chatham Cup
September 1976 sports events in New Zealand